Ali Akman (born 18 April 2002) is a Turkish professional footballer who plays as a striker for TFF First League club Göztepe, on loan from Eintracht Frankfurt.

Club career

Bursaspor
Akman was promoted to Bursaspor first team in 2019. He scored 12 goals in 39 TFF First League matches.

Eintracht Frankfurt
On 1 February 2021, Akman signed a four-year contract with Eintracht Frankfurt in effect from 1 July 2021. After his contract, which was set to expire in 2021 summer, had been terminated by Bursaspor, he joined the Frankfurt club on 8 March 2021 and immediately began training with the team.

Loan to NEC Nijmegen
On 4 August 2021, he went to NEC Nijmegen on loan.

Loan to Göztepe
On 7 August 2022, Akman moved to Göztepe on a season-long loan with an option to buy.

International career
Akman represented Turkey at many youth levels.

Personal life
Akman is the nephew of former Galatasaray midfielder and Turkish international Ayhan Akman.

Honours
Individual
Eredivisie Talent of the Month: August 2021

References

External links

2002 births
Living people
People from Yıldırım
Turkish footballers
Turkey youth international footballers
Turkey under-21 international footballers
Association football forwards
TFF Second League players
TFF First League players
Eredivisie players
Bursaspor footballers
Eintracht Frankfurt players
NEC Nijmegen players
Göztepe S.K. footballers
Turkish expatriate footballers
Expatriate footballers in the Netherlands
Turkish expatriate sportspeople in the Netherlands
Expatriate footballers in Germany
Turkish expatriate sportspeople in Germany